Smeared is the debut studio album by Canadian rock band Sloan. It was released in Canada on October 1, 1992, and in the United States in January, 1993, on Geffen Records. The album was recorded at a low cost of $1,200. The album is ranked 86th in the 2007 book The Top 100 Canadian Albums by music journalist Bob Mersereau and is widely considered a seminal album of Canada's 1990s alternative rock scene. In an interview with GuitarWorld, in December 2022, Patrick Pentland stated that a Smeared 30th Anniversary reissue is in the works, slated for 2023.

Overview
Like their first release, the Peppermint EP, Smeared received comparisons to Sonic Youth and Beatles.  Three songs from Peppermint re-appear on Smeared; one of these ("Underwhelmed") was entirely re-recorded, while the other two ("Marcus Said" and "Sugartune") are the same recordings with new mixing. The band had originally intended to name the album Gluegun.

Music videos were produced for the tracks "Underwhelmed" and "500 Up", with both receiving moderate rotation on MuchMusic in the early 1990s. Jennifer Pierce, of fellow Halifax band Jale, sang backing vocals on "I Am the Cancer".

Commercial performance
By September 1993, the album had sold more than 150,000 copies worldwide. The album was certified Gold in Canada on July 12, 1995. By February 1997, the album had sold 60,000 units in Canada.

Track listing
All songs credited to Sloan.

Japanese Bonus Tracks

Credits
Jay Ferguson – guitar, vocals
Chris Murphy – bass, vocals, erased guitar
Patrick Pentland – guitar, vocals, bass
Andrew Scott – drums, vocals, guitar
Jennifer Pierce – backing vocals ("I Am the Cancer")

References

Sloan (band) albums
1992 debut albums
Murderecords albums